Temitope Olusesi (born September 22, 1996 in Sapele, Delta State, Nigeria) is a Nigerian professional footballer, who plays as a right-back for Enugu Rangers in the Nigeria Professional Football League.

Club career 
Olusesi started his career from Heartland Team B, he gained promotion to the first team Heartland F.C. in 2014 where he signed his first professional contract. He sometimes play the role of an attacker.

Olusesi joined Enugu Rangers in the 2016–17 Nigeria Professional Football League season on a three-year contract.

He previously served as a vice captain of the club before his appointment as the general captain in 2020.

Olusesi has also played at the 2019–20 CAF Confederation Cup in 2019.

Honours
Enugu Rangers
 Nigeria Professional Football League: 2016 
 Nigerian FA Cup: 2018 

Individual
Nigeria Professional Football League (NPFL) VAT Wonder Goal Award: 2018

References

Living people
1996 births
Nigerian footballers
Association football fullbacks
Nigeria Professional Football League players
Rangers International F.C. players